Lirularia pygmaea is a species of sea snail, a marine gastropod mollusk in the family Trochidae, the top snails.

Description
The shell grows to a height of 4 mm.

Distribution
This marine species occurs off Japan.

References

 Yokoyama, M., 1922a: Fossils from the upper Musashino of Kazusa and Shimosa. Journal of the College of Science, Imperial University of Tokyo, vol. 44, art. 1, pp. 1–200 + i–viii, pls. 1–17
 Higo, S., Callomon, P. & Goto, Y. (1999) Catalogue and Bibliography of the Marine Shell-Bearing Mollusca of Japan. Elle Scientific Publications, Yao, Japan, 749 pp.

External links
 To GenBank (8 nucleotides; 2 proteins)
 To World Register of Marine Species
 

pygmaea
Gastropods described in 1922